This list of airports in the English county of Norfolk is an annotated list of all active airports, airfields and aerodromes in the county. For military or ex-military airfields, see Norfolk Airfields.

See also
 List of airports in the United Kingdom and the British Crown Dependencies

Buildings and structures in Norfolk
Transport in Norfolk
Airports in the East of England
Airports
 
Norfolk